Stéphane Lucas (born 18 April 1978, in Aubervilliers) is a French former professional footballer who played as a goalkeeper.

Lucas played at the professional level in Ligue 2 for Red Star Saint-Ouen.

References

1978 births
Living people
Association football goalkeepers
French footballers
French expatriate footballers
Expatriate footballers in Spain
Ligue 2 players
Championnat National players
Championnat National 2 players
Championnat National 3 players
Segunda División B players
Red Star F.C. players
Real Oviedo Vetusta players
Olympique Noisy-le-Sec players
Angoulême Charente FC players
AS Poissy players
Paris FC players
AS Beauvais Oise players
Racing Club de France Football players
FC Chambly Oise players
FCM Aubervilliers players